Fouzia El Bayed (also Elbayed) is a Moroccan women's rights advocate, a former member of the Parliament of Morocco belonging to the Constitutional Union party, a member of the Human Rights Committee of Liberal International, and the first president of the Morocco chapter of the International Network of Liberal Women.

References 

21st-century Moroccan women politicians
21st-century Moroccan politicians
Moroccan women's rights activists
Members of the Parliament of Morocco
Constitutional Union (Morocco) politicians
Year of birth missing (living people)
Living people